Fatsia oligocarpella is a species of flowering plant in the family Araliaceae, native to the Bonin Islands and the Volcano Islands, both belonging to Japan.

References

oligocarpella
Flora of the Volcano Islands
Flora of the Bonin Islands
Plants described in 1918